Clifford Annex was a building in Grand Forks, North Dakota.  It was listed on the U.S. National Register of Historic Places, but was destroyed in the 1997 Red River flood, and was delisted in 2004.

Along with Wright Block, the Telephone Co. Building, the Dinnie Block, and Golden Square, the Clifford Annex was one of many "commercial vernacular brick buildings with classical revival details" that were built during a major building boom, with high quality brickwork.

The Clifford Annex was built in 1906.  It included Early Commercial, vernacular, and other architecture.

References

Further reading
 and 
 

Former National Register of Historic Places in North Dakota
Buildings designated early commercial in the National Register of Historic Places in North Dakota
Vernacular architecture in North Dakota
Buildings and structures completed in 1906
National Register of Historic Places in Grand Forks, North Dakota
1906 establishments in North Dakota
Former buildings and structures in North Dakota
1997 disestablishments in North Dakota
1997 Red River flood
Buildings and structures destroyed by flooding